Thomas Scott Lambert (May 22, 1819 - March 31, 1897) was an American physician. Lambert was born in Wakefield, Massachusetts and was educated in medicine at Castleton, Vermont, where he took his M. D. in 1845. He lectured extensively on medical and educational themes and wrote a number of books.  Dr. Lambert died from pneumonia in 1897, aged 78.

References 

People from Wakefield, Massachusetts
1819 births
1897 deaths
American physicians
Physicians from Massachusetts